The Leader of the Liberal Party, also known as Leader of the Parliamentary Liberal Party, is the highest office within the Liberal Party of Australia and the Liberal–National Coalition. The position is currently, and has been since 30 May 2022, held by Peter Dutton, who represents the Division of Dickson in Queensland. Peter Dutton is the fifteenth leader of the Liberal Party. Dutton is also the first leader of the party to represent a Queensland electorate.

The current Deputy Leader of the Liberal Party is Sussan Ley.

History
The Liberal Party leadership was first held by former United Australia Party leader and eventual co–founder Robert Menzies, along with eighteen political organisations and groups.

Following the oustings of two Liberal prime ministers in three years, Scott Morrison introduced a new threshold to trigger a Liberal Party leadership change in government, requiring two-thirds of the partyroom vote to trigger a spill motion. The change was introduced at an hour long party room meeting on the evening of 3 December 2018. Morrison said the changes, which were drafted with feedback from former prime ministers John Howard and Tony Abbott, would only apply to leaders who lead the party to victory at a federal election.

Role
Since the days of Menzies, the Liberal Party has either been in government with a coalition or in opposition to the Labor. Thus, the leader of the Liberal Party can often be the Prime Minister of Australia or Leader of the Opposition. Furthermore, the leader picks the Cabinet and is also the leader of the Coalition. The Liberal Party only had one leader of the party from the Senate, John Gorton, for a brief period in January 1968 before he resigned from the Senate to contest the Higgins by-election in February 1968.

Leaders of the Liberal Party

A list of leaders (including acting leaders) since 1945.

Federal leaders by time in office

Totals for leaders who served multiple non-consecutive terms:
 John Howard: 16 years, 184 days
 Malcolm Turnbull: 
 Andrew Peacock: 3 years, 142 days

Federal deputy leaders

Leaders in the Senate

See also

 Leader of the Australian Labor Party

Notes

References

Leader
 
Liberal Party